Jason Edwards (born 14 September 2002) is a British speedway rider.

Career
In 2017, Edwards made a number of guest appearances at reserve after he turned 15 as he was then eligible to ride. He made his National league debut for Lakeside Hammers on 29 September 2017 against Belle Vue Colts, he had an excellent debut scoring 9+1 from 5 rides. Edwards made more appearances for Lakeside and also rode some meetings for Eastbourne Eagles.

In 2018, he moved from reserve into the main Eastbourne team for the first time, riding at number 2 for the rest of the season. Edwards also won the League and cup double with Eastbourne defeating Mildenhall Fen Tigers in both finals. Additionally he rode for the Cradley team that only competed in the National Trophy. He helped the Heathens finish top of the North group taking them to the final against Mildenhall.

In 2019, he re-joined the Eagles after their move up to the SGB Championship and also signed for the Mildenhall Fen Tigers.

Edwards resigned for Eastbourne at the start of the 2020 season which was curtailed by the COVID-19 pandemic and the 2021 season, but moved to Plymouth Gladiators when Eastbourne withdrew from the league.

Edwards signed a new contract for Redcar Bears in the SGB Championship for the 2022 season and later became an asset of the club. He won the British U-21 semi-final at Mildenhall with a 15 point maximum. Additionally, he finished second in the league averages for Mildenhall in the 2022 National Development League speedway season and was voted their rider of the year.

In 2023, Edwards was named in the King's Lynn Stars team as the rising star for the SGB Premiership 2023. He also re-signed for Redcar Bears for the SGB Championship 2023.

References

Living people
2002 births
British speedway riders
Cradley Heathens riders
Eastbourne Eagles riders
King's Lynn Stars riders
Mildenhall Fen Tigers riders
Plymouth Gladiators speedway riders
Redcar Bears riders